Gold FM may refer to:

 Gold 905, an English radio station in Singapore
 Gold FM (Fiji), an English language radio station in Fiji
 Gold FM (Sri Lanka), a radio station in Sri Lanka
 92.5 Gold FM, an Australian radio station in Queensland
 Gold FM 98.3, a radio station in the Philippines
 Gold (New Zealand radio network) a New Zealand radio station